Vallay is an uninhabited tidal island in the Scottish Outer Hebrides. It can be reached from North Uist by a long beach at low tide.

Once the island supported a population of nearly sixty people. Its best-known inhabitant was the archaeologist Erskine Beveridge. The island is also known for its sea birds and for prehistoric monuments.

References

Uist islands
Sites of Special Scientific Interest in Western Isles South
Uninhabited islands of the Outer Hebrides
Tidal islands of Scotland